HMS Neptune was a 90-gun second-rate ship of the line of the Royal Navy. She was built under the 1677 "Thirty Great Ships" Programme and launched in 1683 at Deptford Dockyard.

Naval career

She was first commissioned in 1690 under Captain Thomas Gardiner, as the flagship of Vice-Admiral George Rooke. In that capacity she took part in the Battle of Barfleur in May 1692.

She underwent her first rebuild at William Johnson's yard at Blackwall Yard, from where she was relaunched on 6 May 1710 as a 90-gun second-rate built to the 1706 Establishment. She was recommissioned on 3 February 1711 under Capt. Francis Wyvell, but paid off into reserve in July of that year and saw no service.

On 18 August 1724 Neptune was ordered to be taken to pieces and rebuilt as a 90-gun second-rate to the 1719 Establishment at Woolwich Dockyard, from where she was relaunched on 15 October 1730. She was cut down to a 74-gun third rate at Chatham Dockyard from 1747 to April 1749, and was renamed HMS Torbay on 23 August 1750, the previous ship bearing this name having been broken up in 1749.

Capture of Le Roche
On 28 November 1756, Torbay engaged and defeated the 22-gun French privateer La Roche off the southwest coast of Wales. All but two of the French crew were brought aboard the British vessel as prisoners; the remaining two men were left on La Roche with eight of Torbays crew to help sail her into an English port as a prize. Torbay and La Roche then parted company, with the prize vessel heading for the port city of Milford Haven. On the second night of that voyage the two Frenchmen broke out of their cabin and attacked the British sailors, killing one and wounding the others. The seven surviving British men surrendered and were imprisoned on the steerage deck while the French attempted to turn the vessel back towards the French coast.

By the following morning the British had developed a plan for escape; with some effort a hole was made in the hull and one sailor climbed the outside of the ship, re-entering at the gundeck. Obtaining a musket, he shot dead one of the French; the other leapt overboard but was persuaded to return to the vessel on a promise of being spared. Again in command of the vessel, the Torbay crewmembers then reset course for Milford Haven.

In 1759, under the command of Captain Augustus Keppel, the ship served in the Battle of Quiberon Bay.

Fate
Her last action was as part of the blue squadron at the Battle of the Saintes under Captain Keppel.

Torbay was sold at Portsmouth to be taken to pieces on 17 August 1784.

Notes

References

Lavery, Brian (2003), The Ship of the Line - Volume 1: The development of the battlefleet 1650-1850. Conway Maritime Press. .
Winfield, Rif (2007), British Warships in the Age of Sail, 1714-1792. Seaforth Publishing. . (2009) British Warships in the Age of Sail, 1603-1714. Seaforth Publishing.

External links
 

Ships of the line of the Royal Navy
1680s ships
Ships built by the Blackwall Yard
Ships built in Deptford